Daoguanhe Reservoir, also known as Taoist Temple River Reservoir, is a large-sized reservoir in Xinzhou District, Wuhan City, Hubei Province, China, located on the Daoguan River, a tributary of the Sha River. It is mainly used for irrigation, taking into account flood control, power generation, farming and other comprehensive use.

Construction of the Daoguanhe Reservoir started in October 1958, and was completed in 1968. The average water depth of the reservoir is 10.3m, with a total storage capacity of 100 million cubic meters.

References

Reservoirs in China
Buildings and structures in Hubei
Buildings and structures completed in 1968